Telecommunications is one of the most modern, diverse and fast-growing sectors in the economy of Ukraine. Unlike country's dominating export industries, the telecommunications, as well as the related Internet sector, remain largely unaffected by the global economic crisis, ranking high in European and global rankings.

The industry also leads in demonopolization of Ukraine's economy as Ukrtelekom (once the country's sole telephone provider) was successfully privatized, and is now losing its retail market share to independent, foreign-invested private providers.

The entire population of Ukraine now has telephone and/or mobile phone connection; Internet access is universally available in cities and main transport corridors, expanding into smaller settlements.

Ukraine's telecommunication development plan emphasizes further improving domestic trunk lines, international connections, and the mobile cellular system.

International data network

Two new domestic trunk lines are a part of the fiber-optic Trans-Asia-Europe (TAE) system and three Ukrainian links have been installed in the fiber-optic Trans-European Lines (TEL) project that connects 18 countries; additional international service is provided by the Italy-Turkey-Ukraine-Russia (ITUR) fiber-optic submarine cable and by earth stations in the Intelsat, Inmarsat, and Intersputnik satellite systems.

Fixed telephone network
Telephones - land lines in use: 12.681 million (2011)

Upon gaining independence from the USSR in 1991, Ukraine inherited an analog PSTN telephone system that was antiquated, inefficient, and in many places in disrepair; meanwhile demand overwhelmed the supply with more than 3.5 million households applications for telephone lines pending. Telephone density has since risen and the domestic trunk system is being improved; about one-third of Ukraine's networks are digital, and the majority of regional centers now have digital switching stations. Improvements in local networks and local exchanges continue to lag.

Several independent fixed network providers established themselves on the country's retail market, although Ukrtelecom still dominates it.

Mobile phone networks

Market penetration
The mobile cellular telephone system's expansion has slowed, largely due to the saturation of the market, which has reached 125 mobile phones per 100 people.

Telephones - mobile cellular: 55.578  million (2011)

Mobile phone networks

Mobile phone manufacturers 
The following companies in Ukraine are manufacturing mobile phones:

 Borton
 Impression Electronics

Radio broadcast stations

300 (2007)

Ukrainian Amateur Radio League

Internet in Ukraine

country code - .ua
Internet hosts: 2.173 million (2012)
Internet users: 41,8 million (2013)

Telecommunications-related government bodies
Ministry of Infrastructure of Ukraine (Official website )
State Special Communications Service of Ukraine (Official website)
National Commission for the State Regulation of Communications and Informatization of Ukraine (Official website)

See also
Internet in Ukraine
Mobile phone industry in Ukraine

Notes

References

External links

Industry-specific media
Watcher:  - Ukrainian Internet business and marketing online newspaper 
ProIT  - Ukrainian IT industry online newspaper
AIN  - Ukrainian IT industry online newspaper

Other
 CIA World Factbook

 
Internet in Ukraine
Information technology in Ukraine